Llanelli is a constituency of the House of Commons of the Parliament of the United Kingdom. From 1918 to 1970 the official spelling of the constituency name was Llanelly. It elects one Member of Parliament (MP) by the first past the post system of election. Since 2005, it is currently represented by Nia Griffith of the Labour Party. 

The Llanelli Senedd constituency was created with the same boundaries in 1999 (as an Assembly constituency).

Boundaries
1918
The constituency was established in 1918, as a division of Carmarthenshire, located in the south east of the county. This area had, until 1918, been the southern part of the constituency of East Carmarthenshire.

It consisted of the then local authority areas of the Municipal Borough of Llanelly; the Urban Districts of Ammanford, Burry Port and Cwmamman; the Rural Districts of Lanelly and part of Llandilofawr (namely the civil parishes of Betws, Llandybie and Quarter Bach, and Ward I of the civil parish of Llandilo Rural)

The division bordered Carmarthen to the west and north, Brecon and Radnor to the north east, Neath to the east, Gower to the south east and the sea to the south.

1950
In the next redistribution of constituencies in Wales, which took effect in 1950, the northern boundary of the constituency was slightly altered. Llanelly no longer bordered Brecon and Radnor and Gower was extended north and took over the part of the 1918 Neath constituency that had previously adjoined Carmarthenshire. The constituency area continued to include the same local authorities as in 1918 (apart from a spelling change to Llandilo for the part RDC included):
The borough of Llanelly;
The urban districts of Ammanford, Burry Port and Cwmamman;
The rural district of Llanelly and the parish of Bettws in the rural district of Llandilo.

At the 1970 general election the official spelling of the constituency name was altered to Llanelli. This followed the change in name of both the borough and rural district in 1966.

1974
The constituency appears to have been unchanged by the redistribution. The local authorities remained the same (apart from spelling changes):
The borough of Llanelli;
the urban districts of Ammanford, Burry Port and Cwmamman;
the rural district of Llanelli and the parish of Bettws in the rural district of Llandeilo.

The substantial local government changes which took effect in 1974 did not affect this redistribution as it used the boundaries as they existed in November 1970 to construct parliamentary constituencies.

1983
The redistribution altered the constituency by 8.4%. 96.2% of the new constituency had been in the old one. 3.8% of the electors came from the former Carmarthen constituency.

The area now formed part of the new county of Dyfed. The district level local government units contained in the constituency were the Borough of Llanelli and Wards 2–6 and 9 of the Borough of Dinefwr.

1997
In this redistribution the constituency was reduced so that it covered the same area as the Borough of Llanelli.

2010
After the United Kingdom general election in May 2010, the constituency has comprised the Carmarthenshire County electoral divisions of Bigyn, Burry Port, Bynea, Dafen, Elli, Felinfoel, Glanymor, Glyn, Hendy, Hengoed, Kidwelly, Llangennech, Llannon, Lliedi, Llwynhendy, Pembrey, Pontyberem, Swiss Valley, Trimsaran, Tycroes and Tyisha.

The constituency includes the whole of 9 Carmarthenshire communities (Kidwelly; Llanedi; Llanelli; Llanelli Rural;  Llangennech; Llannon; Pembrey and Burry Port Town; Pontyberem; and Trimsaran).

Members of Parliament

History
Llanelli has traditionally been an ultra-safe Labour seat, with a Labour MP representing the constituency since 1922. It was represented by one-time deputy leader of the Labour Party, Jim Griffiths, from 1936 until his retirement in 1970. In recent years however Labour's majority had been somewhat eroded by Plaid Cymru, who as of 2021 have won the equivalent seat in the Senedd in two of the six Senedd elections to date. At the 2015 general election, however, the Labour majority increased once again.

Elections

Elections in the 1910s

Elections in the 1920s

Elections in the 1930s

Elections in the 1940s

Elections in the 1950s

Elections in the 1960s

Elections in the 1970s

Elections in the 1980s

Elections in the 1990s

Elections in the 2000s

Elections in the 2010s

	

 

Of the 152 rejected ballots:
135 were either unmarked or it was uncertain who the vote was for.
17 voted for more than one candidate.

See also
 Llanelli (Senedd constituency)
 List of parliamentary constituencies in Dyfed
 List of parliamentary constituencies in Wales

Notes

References

Further reading
 Boundaries of Parliamentary Constituencies 1885–1972, compiled and edited by F.W.S. Craig (Political Reference Publications 1972)
 British Parliamentary Constituencies: A Statistical Compendium, by Ivor Crewe and Anthony Fox (Faber and Faber 1984)

External links
Politics Resources (election results from 1922 onwards)
Electoral Calculus (election results from 1955 onwards)
2017 Election House of Commons Library 2017 Election report
A Vision of Britain Through Time (constituency elector numbers)

Parliamentary constituencies in South Wales
Constituencies of the Parliament of the United Kingdom established in 1918
Districts of Carmarthenshire
Llanelli
Politics of Carmarthenshire